The Paluma-class motor launch is a class of four hydrographic survey motor launches operated by the Royal Australian Navy (RAN).

Design and construction
The Paluma-class vessels are based on the design of the Prince-class roll-on/roll-off ferry. Propulsion machinery consists of two General Motors Detroit Diesel 12V-92T engines, which supply  to the two propeller shafts.

The sensor suite of a Paluma-class launch consists of a JRC JMA-3710-6 navigational radar, an ELAC LAZ 72 side-scan mapping sonar, and a Skipper 113 hull-mounted scanning sonar. The vessels are unarmed. The standard ship's company consists of three officers and eleven sailors, although another four personnel can be accommodated. The catamarans were originally painted white, but were repainted naval grey in 2002.

The four ships were built by Eglo Engineering, at their shipyard in Port Adelaide, South Australia. The first, was laid down in March 1988, and commissioned into the RAN in February 1989. All four ships were under construction by November 1988, and the last, commissioned in March 1990.

Operations
They are used for hydrographic surveys of the shallow waters around northern Australia, primarily in the Great Barrier Reef. The vessels generally operate in pairs.

Ships

Replacement

Defending Australia in the Asia Pacific Century: Force 2030, the 2009 Department of Defence white paper, proposed replacing the Palumas, along with the RAN's patrol and mine warfare vessels, with a single class of multi-role offshore combatant vessels (OCVs). The new vessels, which could displace up to 2,000 tonnes and be equipped for helicopter or unmanned aerial vehicle operations, will use a modular mission payload system to change between roles as required.

Although the 2013 White Paper committed to the OCV as a long-term plan, it announced that life-extending upgrades to the Palumas would be sought as a short-term solution.

Citations

References

External links
 Official RAN webpage

 
Auxiliary research ship classes